Ogou is a prefecture located in the Plateaux Region of Togo. The prefecture seat is located in Atakpamé.

Canton (administrative divisions) of Ogou include Gnagna, Djama, Woudou, Katoré, Gléï, Ountivou, Akparé, and Datcha.

References 

Prefectures of Togo
Plateaux Region, Togo